This list of Bucknell University alumni includes graduates and former students of Bucknell University.

Academia 

 Peter Balakian, author and poet, Donald M. and Constance H. Rebar Professor of Humanities at Colgate University, winner of the 2016 Pulitzer Prize for Poetry
 Edward McNight Brawley, first African-American graduate, cofounder and president of Selma University and Morris College in Alabama
 Steven T. DeKosky, Dean of the University of Virginia School of Medicine
 Dennis A. Dougherty, Professor of Chemistry at California Institute of Technology
 Frank A. Golder (1877–1929), historian of Russian and a key builder of the Hoover War Library
 Mary W.M. Hargreaves, author, professor of history at the University of Kentucky, and associate editor/coeditor of The Papers of Henry Clay, volumes I through VI (Kentucky, 1959–1981)
 Marc Hauser, author, professor, and Director of the Cognitive Evolution Lab at Harvard University
 Ronald D. Liebowitz, ninth president of Brandeis University, sixteenth president of Middlebury College
 Marty Makary, physician, author, health policy educator and television medical commentator
 Douglas Noll, bioengineer, Ann and Robert H. Lurie Professor of Bioengineering at University of Michigan
 David Nasaw, author, historian, and Pulitzer Prize finalist. Arthur M. Schlesinger, Jr. Distinguished Professor of History, City University of New York
 George Morris Philips, principal of West Chester University from 1881 to 1920
 Robert A. Scott, ninth president of Adelphi University
 Amos Smith, Rhodes-Thompson Professor of Chemistry at the University of Pennsylvania
 Barbara F. Walter, political scientist, member of Council on Foreign Relations and professor at the Graduate School of International Relations and Pacific Studies at the University of California, San Diego.

Business 

 Ted Ammon, New York financier
 Kunitake Andō, President & Group Chief Operating Officer of Sony Corporation
 Ronald S. Baron, New York financier, founder of Baron Funds
 Charles Brandes, Founder, Brandes Investment Partners
 Todd G. Buchholz, economist, investment manager, author, lecturer, and former White House director of economic policy; awarded the Allyn Young Teaching Prize by the Harvard University Department of Economics
 Jane T. Elfers, CEO of The Children's Place, former CEO of Lord & Taylor
 Lance Fritz, CEO of Union Pacific Corporation
 Jessica Jackley, cofounder of  Kiva.org
 Richard Johnson, founder of hotjobs.com
 Kenneth Langone, helped secure capital for co-founders of Home Depot, and former director of the New York Stock Exchange
 Doug Lebda, founder & CEO of LendingTree
 Jessica Livingston, cofounder of YCombinator
 Marc Lore,  president & CEO of Walmart Ecommerce; founder & CEO of Jet.com
 Takeo Shiina President of IBM Japan, and vice-president of IBM
 Greg Skibiski Founder, former CEO & Chairman of Sense Networks
 Trisha Torrey, entrepreneur, author, and founder and director of AdvoConnection and the Alliance of Professional Health Advocates
 David Wood, leader of the Dell computer take-back campaign
 George Young, General Manager of the New York Giants (1979-1997), named NFL Executive of the Year five times

Entertainment

Film and television 
 Gbenga Akinnagbe, actor; plays Chris Partlow on HBO's "The Wire"
 Chris Bender, co-produced movies such as the American Pie series, The Hangover, and others
 John Bolger, actor
 William Bramley actor
 Edward Herrmann, actor
 Evan Coyne Maloney, webmaster/documentary filmmaker
 Robert Mandel, film director and producer, dean of the AFI Conservatory
 Les Moonves, former CBS chairman and CEO
 Nyambi Nyambi, actor; plays Samuel on Mike & Molly
 J.C. Spink, Hollywood talent manager and executive producer of "The Hangover" franchise 
 Ralph Waite, actor
 Bill Westenhofer, Winner of the Academy Award for Best Visual Effects in 2008 (The Golden Compass) and 2013 (Life of Pi)

Music 
 Bill Challis, pioneering jazz arranger (Jean Goldkette, Paul Whiteman, Bix Beiderbecke)
 Kristen Henderson, founder, guitarist and songwriter of Antigone Rising, co-author of Times Two: Two Women in Love and The Happy Family They Made (Simon & Schuster, 2011), named to Buzzfeed's Most Powerful LGBT Icons and Allies List
 Bruce Lundvall, President and CEO of The Blue Note Label Group, including Blue Note Records
 Martin Rubeo, musician and founder of alternative rock band Gramsci Melodic

Other 
 Theodore Beale, a.k.a. Vox Day, musician, writer, publisher and philosopher
 Billy McFarland, convicted fraudster and founder of Fyre Festival. Attended Bucknell for one semester.
 John McPherson, "Close to Home" cartoonist
 Garrett Neff, fashion model

Government

Legislators 
 Diane B. Allen, New Jersey State Senator, Legislative District 7
 Lemuel Amerman, U.S. Representative from Pennsylvania (1891–1893)
 Rob Andrews, U.S. Representative from New Jersey (1990–2014)
 J. Thompson Baker, U.S. Representative from New Jersey (1913–1915), founder of Wildwood and Wildwood Crest, designed and built the J. Thompson Baker House
 Ward R. Bliss, member of Pennsylvania House of Representative (1889–1905), Majority Leader (1903–1904)
 Charles H. Ealy, president pro tempore of the Pennsylvania State Senate (1941–1944)
 Benjamin K. Focht, US Congressman from Pennsylvania
 Matt Gabler, member of Pennsylvania House of Representatives
 John A. Giannetti, member of Maryland Senate, District 21
 Norman J. Levy, member of New York State Senate, (1971–1998)
 Simon Peter Wolverton, U.S. Representative from Pennsylvania (1891–1895)

Attorneys and judges 
 Thomas J. Baldrige, Pennsylvania lawyer, Attorney General, Superior Court judge and president judge
 Colonel Matthew Bogdanos, member of the United States Marine Corps, New York City Assistant District Attorney, and author
 John Warren Davis, Judge of the United States Court of Appeals for the Third Circuit
 Oliver Booth Dickinson, Judge of the United States District Court for the Eastern District of Pennsylvania
 Frederick Voris Follmer, Judge of the United States District Courts for the Eastern, Middle, and Western Districts of Pennsylvania, Chief Judge of the Middle District of Pennsylvania
 Gitanjali Gutierrez, first lawyer to meet with a detainee at Guantanamo Bay, Information Commissioner for Bermuda
 Robert Dixon Herman, Judge of the United States District Court for the Middle District of Pennsylvania
 William Hoeveler, Judge of the United States District Court for the Southern District of Florida, presided over Manuel Noriega trial
 Albert Williams Johnson, Judge of the United States District Court for the Middle District of Pennsylvania

Mayors 
 Neal Blaisdell, former mayor of Honolulu
 Thomas Richards, mayor of Rochester, New York

Diplomats 
 David Jayne Hill, diplomat, ambassador, and writer
 William Braucher Wood, former U.S. Ambassador to Afghanistan

Military 
 Charles I. Carpenter, first Chief of Chaplains of the U.S. Air Force
 Susan J. Crawford, lawyer and judge who served as the Convening Authority for the Guantanamo military commissions, chief judge of the United States Court of Appeals for the Armed Forces, Inspector General of the Department of Defense; also Chair of Bucknell Board of Trustees
 Lewis Merrill, Union Army general.  Attended prior to entering West Point.
 George H. Ramer, United States Marine Lieutenant, posthumously received the Medal of Honor on January 7, 1953
 Theodore Van Kirk, Enola Gay Navigator on August 6, 1945
 Lawrence Wilkerson, retired Army colonel, former chief of staff to Colin Powell, vocal critic of the Iraq war.  Attended for three years before volunteering for service in Vietnam

Activists 
 Ye Htoon, Burmese political dissident

Other 
 Ben T. Elliott,  director of speech writing during President Ronald Reagan's administration
 Jay Fisette, member of Arlington County, Virginia's Board of Supervisors
 Dan Oates, Aurora, Colorado, Police Chief
 Norman Thomas, six-time US presidential candidate for the Socialist Party of America from 1928 to 1948

Journalism 
 Jim Vicevich, Radio talk show host of WTIC-AM's Sound Off Connecticut

Literature 
 David Kahn, historian, journalist, and writer
 Michael Malice, author, columnist, and media personality
 Philip Roth, author, winner of the Pulitzer Prize and the National Book Award, and recipient of the National Humanities Medal and the Man Booker International Prize, among many other honors.
Nancy Wood, poet and photographer

Medical 
Shaw Loo, Burma's first physician

Religion 
 Tim Keller, theologian & pastor of the Redeemer Presbyterian Church, New York City

Sports 

 Jim Albus, professional golfer
 Earl Beecham, American football player
 George Buckheit, long-distance runner
 Bryan Cohen (born 1989), American-Israeli basketball player
 Andrew Copelan, head coach of the Fairfield Stags men's lacrosse team
 Bill Courtney, head coach of the Cornell Big Red men's basketball team
 Matt Daley, former Major League Baseball pitcher for the New York Yankees
 Sunil Gulati, President, United States Soccer Federation
 Clarke Hinkle, National Football League fullback & Hall of Fame inductee
 Jon Robert Holden, naturalized Russian basketball player, played for CSKA Moscow and Russian Olympic team
 Doggie Julian, former college and NBA basketball coach, led Holy Cross to NCAA national championship
 Bob Keegan, former Major League Baseball pitcher
 Christopher McNaughton, German basketball international
 Christy Mathewson, former Major League Baseball player & member of the Baseball Hall of Fame (graduated at Keystone College)
 Mike Muscala, Oklahoma City Thunder Center/Power Forward
 Bill Reifsnyder, long-distance runner who won two U.S. marathon national titles
 Greg Schiano, former head coach of the Tampa Bay Buccaneers and the Rutgers Scarlet Knights football teams
Tyler Senerchia, professional wrestler for All Elite Wrestling. Former long-stick midfielder for the Bucknell Bison men's lacrosse team. 
Nate Sestina (born 1997), basketball player in the Israeli Basketball Premier League
 Walt Szot, American football player
 Brett Wilkinson, Olympic rower in Athens 2004
 Ted Woodward, former head coach of the University of Maine basketball team
 Jay Wright, head coach of the Villanova University basketball team since 2001. 
 Weldon Wyckoff, former Major League Baseball player

References 

Bucknell University